Damned If You Do may refer to:
 "Damned If You Do" (House), an episode of the American TV series House
 "Damned If You Do...", an episode of the American TV series Gotham
 "Damned If You Do" (NCIS), an episode of the American TV series NCIS
 Damned If You Do (album), an album by American heavy metal band Metal Church